Sainte-Sophie is a municipality in the Laurentides region of Quebec, Canada, part of the La Rivière-du-Nord Regional County Municipality.

History
The new Municipality of Sainte-Sophie was created on May 2, 2000, when the old Municipality of Sainte-Sophie was merged with the Village Municipality of New Glasgow.

Demographics
Population trend:
 Population in 2021: 18,080 (2016 to 2021 population change: 15.2%)
 Population in 2016: 15,690 (2011 to 2016 population change: 17.3%)
 Population in 2011: 13,375 (2006 to 2011 population change: 29.2%)
 Population in 2006: 10,355 (2001 to 2006 population change: 15.5%)
 Population in 2001: 8966
 Population in 1996: 8691
 Sainte-Sophie: 8534
 New Glasgow: 157
 Population in 1991:
 Sainte-Sophie: 7377
 New Glasgow: 167

Private dwellings occupied by usual residents: 7,211 (total dwellings: 7,490)

Education
The Commission scolaire de la Rivière-du-Nord operates French-language public schools.
 École primaire du Joli-Bois
 École primaire Jean-Moreau
 École primaire Sainte-Sophie
 The primary school Sacré-Coeur in Saint-Jérôme serves a section
 École secondaire Cap-Jeunesse and École secondaire des Hauts-Sommets in Saint-Jérôme

Sir Wilfrid Laurier School Board operates English-language public schools. Schools serving the town:
 Laurentia Elementary School in Saint-Jérôme
 Laurentian Regional High School in Lachute

References

External links

Incorporated places in Laurentides
Municipalities in Quebec
Canada geography articles needing translation from French Wikipedia